Edward Drake Brockman (20 December 1793 – 5 November 1858) was a British barrister and Whig politician.

Brockman was a younger son of James Drake Brockman of Beachborough, near Hythe, Kent, High Sheriff of Kent for 1791. He studied law at the Inner Temple and was called to the bar in 1819, becoming Recorder of Folkestone.

He was elected Whig MP for Hythe at the 1847 general election and held the seat until 1857, when he did not stand in that year's general election.

References

External links
 

1793 births
1858 deaths
Members of the Inner Temple
Whig (British political party) MPs for English constituencies
UK MPs 1847–1852
UK MPs 1852–1857